Crvena jabuka is a Bosnian pop-rock band.

Crvena jabuka or Crvena Jabuka may also refer to:

 Crvena jabuka (album), an album by the eponymous band
 Crvena Jabuka (Babušnica), a village in Serbia
 Crvena Jabuka (Ub), a village in Serbia